Joseph Bradshaw (1835 – 29 August 1893), born in Pettigreen, Dromkeen, County Limerick, was an Irish recipient of the Victoria Cross, the highest and most prestigious award for gallantry in the face of the enemy that can be awarded to British and Commonwealth forces.

Details

Bradshaw was approximately 20 years old, and a private in the 2nd Battalion, The Rifle Brigade (Prince Consort's Own), British Army during the Crimean War when the following deed took place for which he was awarded the VC.

On 22 April 1855 in the Crimea, Private Bradshaw and another private (Robert Humpston), on their own attacked and captured a Russian rifle pit situated among the rocks overhanging the Woronzoff Road. The pit was occupied every night by the Russians and its capture and subsequent destruction was of great importance.

Further information
He later achieved the rank of corporal. He died at St Johns, Limerick, County Limerick 29 August 1893. 

His Victoria Cross is displayed at the Royal Green Jackets (Rifles) Museum, Winchester, Hampshire, England.

References

Listed in order of publication year 
The Register of the Victoria Cross (1981, 1988 and 1997)

Ireland's VCs (Dept of Economic Development, 1995)
Monuments to Courage (David Harvey, 1999)
Irish Winners of the Victoria Cross (Richard Doherty & David Truesdale, 2000)

External links
Location of grave and VC medal (Co. Limerick, Ireland)

Crimean War recipients of the Victoria Cross
British Army personnel of the Crimean War
Irish recipients of the Victoria Cross
Rifle Brigade soldiers
Military personnel from County Limerick
Irish soldiers in the British Army
19th-century Irish people
1835 births
1893 deaths
British military personnel of the Indian Rebellion of 1857
British Army recipients of the Victoria Cross